Christopher T. Hill (born  June 19, 1951) is an American theoretical physicist at the Fermi National Accelerator Laboratory who did undergraduate work in physics at M.I.T. (B.S., M.S., 1972), and graduate work at Caltech (Ph.D., 1977, Murray Gell-Mann).   Hill's Ph.D. thesis, "Higgs Scalars and the Nonleptonic Weak Interactions" (1977) contains one of the first detailed discussions of the two-Higgs-doublet model
and its impact upon weak interactions.  

Hill is an originator of the idea that the Higgs boson is composed
of top and anti-top quarks. This emerged from the concept of the
top quark infrared fixed point,
which predicted (1981) that the top quark would be very heavy, contrary
to most popular ideas at the time. The fixed point prediction
lies within 20% of the observed top quark mass (1995). This implies
that the top quarks are strongly coupled at  very short
distances and can form a composite Higgs boson, and led to top quark condensates, topcolor, and also dimensional deconstruction, which is a renormalizable, lattice description of extra dimensions of space. 
The composite Higgs binding
mechanism may be gravitation, which improves the agreement of the fixed point with the top quark mass, and predicts
that there exist many sequential, heavier Higgs bosons 
with large couplings to all quarks and leptons. This may
explain the puzzle of the many small parameters in the standard model.
Several new heavy Higgs bosons, such as the b-quark Higgs bound state,
may be accessible to the LHC in the process
 (b
and anti-b quark).  
 

Hill coauthored (with Elizabeth H. Simmons) a comprehensive review of strong dynamical theories
which has shaped many of the experimental searches for new physics at the Tevatron and LHC.

Heavy-light mesons contain a heavy quark and a light anti-quark, and display 
remarkable chiral dynamics (see chiral symmetry breaking).
Hill co-developed the theory which
correctly predicted an abnormally long-lived resonance, 
been confirmed by experiment.  

This revealed new anomalous interactions such as 
where  is a heavy nucleus.
  
Hill is an originator of cosmological models of dark energy and dark matter based upon ultra-low mass bosons associated with neutrino masses and was first to propose that the cosmological constant is
He has also developed modern theories of the origin of ultra-high-energy nucleons and neutrinos from grand unification relics, such as cosmic strings.  
With Graham Ross he has focused more recently on spontaneously broken scale symmetry (or Weyl symmetry), where the scale of gravity (Planck mass) and the inflationary phase of the ultra-early universe are generated together as part of a unified phenomenon dubbed "inertial symmetry breaking." 

Hill is Distinguished Scientist Emeritus at Fermilab,  former Head of the Theoretical Physics Department (2005 - 2012) and a Fellow of the American Physical Society (since 1989).  He has co-authored three popular books with Nobel laureate Leon Lederman
about physics and cosmology, and the commissioning of the Large Hadron Collider.

Books
 Symmetry and the Beautiful Universe, Christopher T. Hill and Leon M. Lederman, Prometheus Books (2005) 
 Quantum Physics for Poets, Christopher T. Hill and Leon M. Lederman, Prometheus Books (2010)  
 Beyond the God Particle, Christopher T. Hill and Leon M. Lederman, Prometheus Books (2013)
 Google Scholar Profile of Christopher T. Hill

References

External links
Fermilab Theoretical Physics Department

Living people
21st-century American physicists
Particle physicists
Fellows of the American Physical Society
California Institute of Technology alumni
1951 births
MIT Department of Physics alumni
People associated with Fermilab